Sprawling Fawns is the third album by Inga Liljeström. It was released in 2006. It contains five new songs and six remixes of songs from Elk. "Some Velvet Morning" is a cover of a psychedelic pop song written by Lee Hazlewood and originally recorded by Hazlewood and Nancy Sinatra in late 1967.

Track listing
"High Flying Birds" - 4:01
"You Shine" - 5:29
"Lira (Lake Lustre Remix)" - 4:36
"29 Poisons (Kevin Purdy Remix)" - 5:13
"Some Velvet Morning (with Peter Fenton)" - 5:15
"Wild Is the Wind" - 4:12
"Awkward Like a Boy" - 3:33
"All of This (Jacob Cook Remix)" - 3:58
"Stolen (Saddleback Remix)" - 3:09
"Deer (Ben Frost Remix)" - 3:04
"Lira (Pimmon Remix)" - 6:47

References

2006 albums
Inga Liljeström albums